Ivo Gregurević (7 October 1952 – 1 January 2019) was a Croatian film, theatre and television actor. Throughout over a quarter of a century, Gregurević played rural bullies and arrogant nouveau riche and became one of Croatia's best known and most lauded character actors.

Biography
Born in the village of Donja Mahala, Ivo was the child of Marko and Jela Gregurević. He graduated from the Zagreb Academy of Dramatic Art, and has worked in over 90 movies and television programs since the late 1970s; in particular, he acted in almost all of Croatian movies after gaining independence in 1991. He also had few starring roles, best known being in 1991 film Čaruga. Croatian film director Snježana Tribuson has stated that she had intentionally cast Gregurević in almost all of her movies.

Besides movie roles, he made the successful appearances in popular Croatian TV series, Velo misto, playing the Netjak, and Marko Kosmički in Odmori se, zaslužio si. He has won two Croatian Actors' Association Awards for Šokica (1998) and Duga mračna noć (2006). In 2005 he was ranked second in the Croatian-based film magazine Hollywood in the "Best Croatian Male Movie Stars of All Time" list.

Personal life
Gregurević was in a relationship with Croatian actress Dubravka Ostojić, with whom he had a son Marko, born in 1978. Following their rupture, Gregurević reported he has been in a relationship with the actress Dolores Lambaša. Last years, Gregurević was in a relationship with, to media unknown woman, who works as an inspector with the Croatian Ministry of the Interior.

Gregurević was found dead in his own home in Zagreb on 2 January 2019, but he died the day before. He was 66. He was buried at Karaula Cemetery in his hometown of Donja Mahala, on 8 January.

Awards and nominations
Sources:
Golden Arena Award

Nagrada Fabijan Šovagović

Vladimir Nazor Award

Performances

Films

Television

Music videos

Source:

References

External links
 
Ivo Gregurević biography and filmography  
 Godina bez ijednog hrvatskog filma s Ivom Gregurevićem 

1952 births
2019 deaths
Croatian male film actors
People from Orašje
Croats of Bosnia and Herzegovina
Croatian male television actors
Vladimir Nazor Award winners
Golden Arena winners
Croatian Theatre Award winners
20th-century Croatian male actors
21st-century Croatian male actors
Yugoslav male film actors
Yugoslav male television actors